Jerome Township is one of the fourteen townships of Union County, Ohio, United States.  The 2010 census found 7,541 people in the township.

Geography
Located in the southeastern corner of the county, it borders the following townships:
Millcreek Township - north
Concord Township, Delaware County - northeast
Washington Township, Franklin County - southeast
Darby Township, Madison County - south
Darby Township - west

Parts of two municipalities are located in Jerome Township: the village of Plain City in the southwest, and the city of Dublin in the southeast.  The unincorporated communities of Arnold, Jerome, and New California are also located within the township.

Its location in the southeast corner of the county makes it the closest part of the county to Columbus.

Name and history
It is the only Jerome Township statewide.

Jerome Township was organized on March 12, 1821.  As of 1854, the population of the township was 1249.

In the Civil War, 367 residents of Jerome Township enlisted to fight.  This was a remarkably high level, 151 more than were recognized as voters (only 216) and fully 25% of the population of 1398.  It included several boys aged 16 and one aged 14.  75 of those who enlisted died or were killed in the war.  They, and the service of township residents in the War of 1812, the Mexican War and the war with Spain in 1898, are commemorated with a war memorial more than 20 feet high in New California.

Government
The township is governed by a three-member board of trustees, who are elected in November of odd-numbered years to a four-year term beginning on the following January 1. Two are elected in the year after the presidential election and one is elected in the year before it. There is also an elected township fiscal officer, who serves a four-year term beginning on April 1 of the year after the election, which is held in November of the year before the presidential election. Vacancies in the fiscal officership or on the board of trustees are filled by the remaining trustees.

References

Further reading
Curry, W.L., History of Jerome Township, Union County, Ohio, Heritage Books, Inc., Columbus, Ohio, 1913

External links
Township website
County website

Townships in Union County, Ohio
Populated places established in 1821
Townships in Ohio